William Amos Smith (May 15, 1871 – October 15, 1937)  (Aka "Mysterious Billy" Smith) was a Canadian born two-time world welterweight boxing champion of the world:  first at age 21 in 1892, then again in 1898 at the age of 27.  He became famous world-wide for his boxing success and also became infamous for his associations and involvement with criminal activities in Portland, Oregon, in the early 1900s. He was later described as the "Dirtiest fighter of all Time". Smith died at the age of 66 on October 15, 1937, and was buried at Multnomah Park Cemetery in Portland Oregon.

He was posthumously inducted into the International Boxing Hall of Fame in the class of 2009.

1871 Biography
William Amos Smith was born in Little River, Digby, Nova Scotia, Canada, on May 15, 1871, to Robert James Smith (1831-1895) and Adelia Dakin (1838-1902). William was the sixth and last child born to this family. His father was a fisherman who was born in the USA. William had three older brothers (Nelson Wentworth Smith, St Clair Smith and Thomas Dakin Smith) and two sisters (Elizabeth and Adelaide Smith).

William was first documented at age 10 on the 1881 Canadian census in Lepreau, New Brunswick, Canada, with his entire family. He was listed by his middle name (Amos) and as being born in Nova Scotia.

William's older brother Thomas Dakin Smith moved from the East Coast to the state of Oregon in late 1887. Thomas married Mary Elizabeth Beech in 1888 in Benton County, Oregon. Thomas then moved to Portland, Oregon, and was listed in an 1894 city directory,  and again in the 1900 census. In both references Thomas was employed as a buggy washer. By moving to Portland, Thomas created a familial anchor base that his younger brother William would use when he pursued his boxing career from Canada to San Francisco to Portland, Oregon.

Meanwhile, back in Canada, 19-year-old William found early success in boxing. Amos William Smith fought Ed Harvey to a draw on December 1, 1890, in Saint John, New Brunswick, Canada.  His manager at this time was his second eldest brother St. Claire Smith. William also beat Frank Tebeau by TK in 5 rounds. (Need another citation for date.)

1891 San Francisco, California 
In early 1891 (age 19), William Amos Smith traveled from the East Coast (Canada/USA) to San Francisco, California, to pursue his boxing career.

In 1891, William Amos Smith fought and beat a man named Breslin. (need citation).

He boxed at the following venues in San Francisco from January 20, 1892, to March 21, 1892:
  California Athletic Club - San Francisco
  Wigwam Theatre - San Francisco
  Occidental Athletic Club - San Francisco

William fought two exhibitions matches against older established boxers.

His first fight was against John Edward Kelly, aka Jack Dempsey, aka Nonpareil Dempsey, who was 9 years older than William Amos Smith and a weight class above him.  Dempsey was the first holder of the world middleweight championship from 1884 to 1891.

William then fought an exhibition match against the Australian boxer called Billy "Shadow" Maber.
.

Exhibition matches sold tickets, which in turn provided money for all involved. These matches were marketed to create excitement and show the young up-and-coming boxer William Amos Smith was able to challenge established, aging boxers.

On January 1, 1892, William Amos Smith (age 20), beat Billy Kelly on points at the California Athletic Club.

On January 27, 1892, he lost to Frank Purcell on points at the California Athletic Club, San Francisco.

On February 16, 1892, he beat Frank Kelley by KO at the Wigwam Theatre.

On March 21, 1892, he beat Billy Armstrong by KO at the Occidental Athletic Club, San Francisco.

1892 Portland Oregon
In 1892, William was 20 years old. His older brother Thomas Dakin Smith, age 23, had previously moved from Canada to Portland, Oregon, and was living there since 1887.

On February 27, 1892, the Sacramento newspaper "The Record-Union" listed welterweight boxers in San Francisco, including "Billy Smith" of Australia, " Billy Smith" of Boston and George Lavigaine (sic: Lavigne).

On April 9, 1892, William traveled by steamship from San Francisco to Portland, Oregon, with another boxer named George "Kid" Lavigne.

Kid Lavigne was three years older than William and fought in the lightweight division. Lavigne and Smith became friends, and both later traveled to London in 1896 to box.

On April 28, 1892, William fought Tommy West to a draw at the Portland Oregon Pastime Athletic Club.

On June 29, 1892, William beat Charles Gleason by TKO at the Portland, Oregon, Pastime Athletic Club. Charles Gleason was an established boxer with a record of 20 wins, 9 losses and 6 draws.

1892 First Marriage: Minnie Valentine Merchant

On July 12, 1892, at age 21, William Amos Smith married Minnie Valentine Merchant age 17 in Clark County, Washington (aka Vancouver, WA).

She was a 17 year old Presbyterian daughter of Sarah Elizabeth Merchant and Joseph Milton Merchant. Joseph Merchant started out as a carpenter who became wealthy in the Portland through his construction business.  They all lived in East Portland, Oregon, yet, William and Minnie went across state to Washington in order to get married. Minnie's mother, Sarah Elizabeth Merchant was listed on the marriage license in Clark County WA.

1892 Wins World Welterweight Title: Gets Fame and Nickname "Mysterious" Billy Smith

On September 20, 1892, William beat Billy (Shadow) Maber by KO at the Pastime Athletic Club in Portland, Oregon.

On December 14, 1892, the San Francisco newspaper, The Morning Call, published and previewed and upcoming fight between Billy Smith of Oregon and Danny Needham of Oakland. This story was likely written the day before or on the morning on December 14. According to the article, the fight was to be held at the Pacific Club.

William "Billy" Smith won the fight vs Danny Needham.

He just won the World Welterweight Boxing Title in San Francisco. Smith claimed he was from Boston. East Coast reporters didn't know him as boxer in their area. To them he was a "Mystery" The name stuck and William Amos Smith adopted it. From that time forward, William Amos Smith was known in newspapers as "Mysterious" Billy Smith, "Mysterious Billy" Smith, Billy Smith, and William Amos Smith.  He is not to be confused with another boxer around this time named "Australian Billy Smith".

On May 11, 1893, his 18-year-old wife, Minnie V Merchant-Smith, died of food or blood poisoning in Lynn, Essex, Massachusetts.

1894 Loses the World Welterweight boxing title
On July 26, 1894, William, age 23, Lost the World Welterweight boxing title to Tommy Ryan at the Twin City Athletic Club in Minneapolis, MN by points.

1896 Boxes in London, England
At age 24, William, aka "Mysterious" Billy Smith traveled to London to fight welterweight boxers that London had to offer. Joining him was his friend George "Kid" Lavigne a lightweight boxer also out of Portland Oregon.

On March 5, 1896, William fought three boxers on the same day and beat them all: Trooper Ham, Jack Bryan and Arthur Morris at Tottenham Court at Road Store Street Hall. He won two by KO and won the 3rd by a DQ from Arthur Morris.

On March 30, 1896, William "Billy" fought Bill Husbands at the National Sporting Club, Covent Garden. Billy won by TKO.

The William Schutte boxing pamphlet has a front page photo of William in a dark suit with a tall stove-type that was taken at this time.  A descendant of William Amos Smith has an original photo.

1898 Second Marriage: Mary Maime Cavanagh
On July 9, 1898, age 27,  William married Mary "Maime" Cavanagh in College Point, Queens, New York, USA. He was age 27 and she was age 22. She was a daughter of David Cavanagh and Ann Kennedy.

1898 Wins World Welterweight boxing title for the second time
On August 25, 1898, William  (age 27) Won the World Welterweight boxing title for the second time vs William 'Matty' Matthews at the Lennox Athletic Club in New York and won by points.

On June 6, 1900, William (age 29) and Mary were listed on the 1900 Census. William was listed as an actor

1900 The Atlantic cafe /saloon Portland Oregon
The Atlantic cafe /saloon was located in the still standing historic Porter Building built in 1898 located at 3rd and Pine. The ground floor is retail and above is 3 floors for living spaces.

1901 Lost the World Welterweight boxing title for the second time
On January 15, 1901, William Lost the World Welterweight boxing title for the second time vs James "Rube" Ferns at the Hawthorne A.C., Buffalo, New York. Smith knocked down Ferns 15 times before he was disqualified for fouling.

On November 30, 1901, Mysterious Billy Smith was back in Portland Oregon. He and (future in-law) Charles Jost boxed the same night on different bouts.

Charles Albert Jost aka "Charley Jost/Yost", boxed under the alias as "Young Fritz"

On October 25, 1902, Charles Jost won the Eastern Oregon boxing middleweight championship against James Lavigne.

Charles Jost later married Elsie Hoffstatter in 1908, the younger sister of Josephine Barde (nee Hoffstatter) and became an in-law to Billy Smith.

"Maime" Cavanaugh-Smith divorced William Smith on June 7, 1907. The next day, her famous ex-husband then married Josephine Hoffstatter-Barde in Oregon City.

Third Marriage

Criminal Activities

Boxing

Smith turned pro in 1890 and in his ninth fight, he knocked out Danny Needham to win the World welterweight championship in 1892. He held on to it until Tommy Ryan beat him on points in 1894. He won back the vacant title in 1898 by beating Matty Matthews, and lost it again in 1900 to Rube Ferns. Smith bowed out in 1915 when stopped by Jack Root. During his career, Smith scored wins over Young Peter Jackson, Hall of Famers “Barbados” Joe Walcott and George “Kid” Lavigne.

Smith died at the age of 66 in Portland, Oregon, where he ran a saloon called “The Champion's Rest.”

He was posthumously inducted into the International Boxing Hall of Fame in 2009.

Fighting style

Standing 5' 8 ½”, Smith was a talented two-fisted battler with quick hands who entered the ring ready to wage war. He often displayed a blatant disregard for the rules, resorting to a variety of foul tactics including but not limited to elbows, butts, knees and sometimes even biting. Smith was notorious for having a very roughhouse fighting style in the ring and was disqualified 13 times, more than any other boxer in history. His tactics earned him the label as “The Dirtiest Fighter Who Ever Lived.”

Professional boxing record
All information in this section is derived from BoxRec, unless otherwise stated.

Official record

All newspaper decisions are officially regarded as “no decision” bouts and are not counted in the win/loss/draw column.

Unofficial record

Record with the inclusion of newspaper decisions in the win/loss/draw column.

See also
Lineal championship
List of welterweight boxing champions

References

|- 

|- 

1871 births
1937 deaths
Welterweight boxers
Boxers from Portland, Oregon
Sportspeople from Nova Scotia
Canadian male boxers
American male boxers